Adventurous Youth is a 1928 British silent Western film directed by Edward Godal and starring Derrick De Marney, Renee Clama and Dino Galvani. It depicts an Englishman (Derrick de Marney) who is voluntarily caught up in the Mexican Revolution. He tries to help save a village, where he has been working, from being sacked and destroyed. The film was made as a quota quickie and distributed in United States by Warner Brothers.

Cast
 Derrick De Marney as the Englishman 
 Renee Clama as Mary Ferguson
 Dino Galvani as Don Esteban 
 Sybil Wise as the Vamp 
 Loftus Tottenham as Mr Ferguson 
 Julius Kantorez as Father O'Flannigan 
 Harry Bagge   
 Lionel d'Aragon  
 Harry Peterson

References

Bibliography
 Chibnall, Steve. Quota Quickies: The Birth of the British 'B' film. British Film Institute, 2007.
 Wood, Linda. British Films, 1927–1939. British Film Institute, 1986.

External links
 
 Movies NY Times

1928 films
1928 Western (genre) films
British black-and-white films
1920s English-language films
Films directed by Edward Godal
Films set in Mexico
Films set in the 1910s
Mexican Revolution films
Silent British Western (genre) films
1920s British films